Savigny-sur-Braye (literally Savigny on Braye) is a commune in the Loir-et-Cher department of central France.

Population

Personalities
 Jeanne Rij-Rousseau, (born 10 June 1870 in Candé – died 22 October 1956 in Savigny-sur-Braye) was a French Cubist painter and an art theoretician

See also
 Braye (river)
Communes of the Loir-et-Cher department

References

Communes of Loir-et-Cher
Orléanais